Salomè is a 1986 Italian-French drama film directed by Claude d'Anna and starring Jo Champa. It is an adaptation of the 1891 Oscar Wilde play play of the same name, and was entered into the 1986 Cannes Film Festival.

Plot
While Jesus is preaching with his Apostles, the confessor John the Baptist is arrested by the king of Judea to the many  defamatory sermons against the power of the monarchy. Herod, son of Herod the Great, imprisons John, and Princess Salome, daughter of Herod, without him being aware of it, secretly falls in love with John the Baptist. But it is a corrupt and lustful love, which comes from lying insults that John turns to the corrupt family of Herod. When Herod, in the birthday of his daughter, asks to Salome what gift she wants, Salome says she wants to see the severed head of John. Herod the content, and so Salome, when John is beheaded, performs the dance of the seven veils, and falls into sexual rapture, kissing full of the passion the mouth of the head. Herod, horrified, puts to death his daughter.

Cast
 Jo Champa as Salome
 Fabrizio Bentivoglio as Yokanaan
 Tomas Milian as Herod
 Pamela Salem as Herodias
 Fabio Carfora as Narraboth
 Lorenzo Piani as Phillip
 Tim Woodward as Nerva
 Feodor Chaliapin, Jr. as Messenger
 Sergio Doria as Horseman
 Annie Carol Edel as the Mother Goddess (as Annie Edel)
 Johara Farley as Princess (as Johara Racz) 
 Paul Muller as the doctor

References

External links

1986 films
1986 drama films
French drama films
Italian drama films
Films shot at EMI-Elstree Studios
Cultural depictions of John the Baptist
Films based on the Gospels
Films directed by Claude d'Anna
Films produced by Menahem Golan
Films set in the 1st century
Golan-Globus films
Films based on Salome (play)
Films produced by Yoram Globus
1980s English-language films
1980s French films
1980s Italian films
English-language French films
English-language Italian films